Okay Bill is a 1971 film directed by John G. Avildsen. The film was also released under the title Sweet Dreams.

See also
 List of American films of 1971

External links

1971 films
American independent films
Films directed by John G. Avildsen
1970s English-language films
1970s American films